Gratangen Church is a parish church of the Church of Norway in Gratangen Municipality in Troms og Finnmark county, Norway. It is located in the village of Årstein, along the shore of the Gratangen fjord. It is the church for the Gratangen parish which is part of the Trondenes prosti (deanery) in the Diocese of Nord-Hålogaland. The modern, concrete and glass church was built in a rectangular design in 1971 using designs drawn up by the architect Oskar Norderval (the son of Bishop Monrad Norderval). The church seats about 220 people.

On the flat roof of the church, there are two triangular vertical concrete slabs that stand close to one another, pointing to the east towards the fjord. In between the two slabs hang the church bells. They are designed to look like a sail on a boat.

See also
List of churches in Nord-Hålogaland

References

Gratangen
Churches in Troms
20th-century Church of Norway church buildings
Churches completed in 1971
1971 establishments in Norway
Millennium sites
Concrete churches in Norway
Rectangular churches in Norway